"Paradise" is a song written by John Prine for his father, and recorded for his 1971 debut album, John Prine. Prine also re-recorded the song for his 1986 album, German Afternoons.

Background
The song is about the devastating impact of strip mining for coal, whereby the top layers of soil are blasted off with dynamite or dug away with steam shovels to reach the coal seam below. The song is also about what happened to the area around the Green River in Kentucky because of strip mining.  The song references the Peabody Coal Company, and a town called Paradise in Muhlenberg County, Kentucky, where the Tennessee Valley Authority operated the Paradise Fossil Plant, a coal-fired electric generating station. The area has suffered serious economic downturn because of the decline of coal mining, caused mainly by the abundance of natural gas. Paradise Fossil Plant Units 1 and 2 went on-line in 1963 and were retired in 2017; Unit 3 went on-line in 1970 and was retired in 2020. In the song Prine asks to have his ashes dispersed on the Green River. After his death in 2020 this wish was fulfilled.  TVA replaced the Fossil Plant with the natural-gas fired Paradise Combined Cycle Plant.

Notable cover versions 
John Fogerty, one of the scores of artists who have covered "Paradise," told Acoustic Guitar magazine in a 2009 interview that "Paradise" is "a touchstone for people like us who decry the way corporations get to run roughshod over what may be desired by the little guy, but he’s powerless to stop it or stand in the way."  
The most successful chart-wise version of the song was by Lynn Anderson in 1976, peaking at #26 on the Billboard country chart.

 Jackie DeShannon recorded her version of "Paradise" for her 1972 album, Jackie, on Atlantic Records. 
 John Denver released a cover of "Paradise" on his 1972 album, Rocky Mountain High.
 Tom T. Hall recorded his version of "Paradise" for his 1976 album, The Magnificent Music Machine.
 Jim and Jesse recorded and performed the song in the early 1970s.
 The Everly Brothers, natives of Muhlenberg County, recorded a version for their 1973 album Pass the Chicken & Listen.
 The Country Gentlemen recorded a version for their 1973 album The Country Gentlemen.
 The Seldom Scene recorded versions for their 1973 album Act II and for their 2014 album Long Time... Seldom Scene.
 Lynn Anderson recorded her version of "Paradise" for her 1976 album, All the King's Horses. The song was also released as a single and peaked at No. 26 on the US Country chart.
 Roy Acuff recorded "Paradise" in 1980.
 A cover recorded by Johnny Cash was used in the soundtrack of the 1981 TV movie The Pride of Jesse Hallam, which starred Cash in the title role. This version was later released on the compilation album Personal File.
 "Paradise" was the end credit song for the film Fire Down Below.
 Tim Flannery, former baseball player, recorded a version of "Paradise" on his 1999 album Pieces of the Past.
 Jimmy Buffett has played "Paradise" twice in concert, in 2002 at Riverbend Music Center in Cincinnati and again in 2008 at Riverbend.  The 2008 Riverbend recording appears on Buffett's 2010 CD Encores.
 Pat Green & Cory Morrow covered "Paradise" on their album Songs We Wish We'd Written, which was released in 2001.
 Dwight Yoakam recorded the song on his 2004 compilation album, Dwight's Used Records. This rendition is divided into two tracks. The first track has a slower tempo, while the second track has a faster tempo.
Hayseed Dixie often include the song in their live setlist and vocalist John Wheeler (aka Barley Scotch) has referred to it on several occasions as his favorite song ever recorded.
 John Fogerty recorded a version as the lead off track for his 2009 album The Blue Ridge Rangers Rides Again.
 John Kadlecik performed this live in an acoustic performance 2011-06-22 at the New Deal Cafe.
 Jamestown Revival recorded the song as the second song on their 2013 EP California
Sturgill Simpson released a cover of the song in 2021 as a single from his upcoming Prine tribute album, Broken Hearts & Dirty Windows Vol. 2.

References

External links
Lyrics

Lynn Anderson songs
John Denver songs
1971 singles
John Prine songs
American folk songs
Songs written by John Prine
Atlantic Records singles
Songs about Kentucky
Muhlenberg County, Kentucky
1971 songs
Environmental songs
Peabody Energy